In Greek mythology, Neso (Ancient Greek: Νησώ Nêsô means 'the island-goddess' or 'nimble') may refer to the following characters:

 Neso, one of the 50 Nereids, marine-nymph daughters of the 'Old Man of the Sea' Nereus and the Oceanid Doris.
 Neso, mother of the Cumaean sibyl.
 Neso, daughter of King Teucer.

Notes

References 

 Hesiod, Theogony from The Homeric Hymns and Homerica with an English Translation by Hugh G. Evelyn-White, Cambridge, MA.,Harvard University Press; London, William Heinemann Ltd. 1914. Online version at the Perseus Digital Library. Greek text available from the same website.
 Kerényi, Carl, The Gods of the Greeks, Thames and Hudson, London, 1951.
 Lycophron, The Alexandra  translated by Alexander William Mair. Loeb Classical Library Volume 129. London: William Heinemann, 1921. Online version at the Topos Text Project.
 Lycophron, Alexandra translated by A.W. Mair. London: William Heinemann; New York: G.P. Putnam's Sons. 1921. Greek text available at the Perseus Digital Library.

Nereids